Svetlana Anatolyevna Samokhvalova (original name: Светлана Анатольевна Самохвапова; born 20 December 1972) is a track and road cyclist from Russia. She participated at the 1992 Summer Olympics in two track cycling disciplines without representing a country as part of the Unified Team. She represented Russia on the road at the 1996 Summer Olympics in the women's road race and women's time trial.

References

External links
 profile at sports-reference.com

1972 births
Living people
Russian female cyclists
Cyclists at the 1992 Summer Olympics
Cyclists at the 1996 Summer Olympics
Olympic cyclists of Russia
Olympic cyclists of the Unified Team
Cyclists from Moscow